Karen Hospital is a private hospital located in Karen suburb, Nairobi, Kenya.

References

Hospital buildings completed in 2006
Hospitals established in 2006
Hospitals in Nairobi